Star Grange No. 9 is a historic grange hall located at Hounsfield in Jefferson County, New York. It was built in 1931 and is a two-story, three by five bay light wood-frame building on a foundation of concrete block.

It was listed on the National Register of Historic Places in 1989.

References

Grange organizations and buildings in New York (state)
Grange buildings on the National Register of Historic Places in New York (state)
Buildings and structures completed in 1931
Buildings and structures in Jefferson County, New York
National Register of Historic Places in Jefferson County, New York